Paraulopus is the only genus in the family Paraulopidae, a family of grinners in the order Aulopiformes. They are commonly known as cucumberfishes, but locally some other Teleostei are also known by that name.  They were considered in the Chlorophthalmidae or greeneye family until 2001.

The fishes tend to be slender and cylindrical, with large eyes and a large terminal mouth with only slightly protruding lower jaw.

Species
The currently recognized species in this genus are:
 Paraulopus atripes Tomoyasu Sato & Nakabo, 2003
 Paraulopus balteatus M. F. Gomon, 2010 (banded cucumberfish)
 Paraulopus brevirostris (Fourmanoir, 1981) (shortsnout cucumberfish)
 Paraulopus filamentosus (Okamura, 1982)
 Paraulopus japonicus (Kamohara, 1956)
 Paraulopus legandi (Fourmanoir & Rivaton, 1979)
 Paraulopus longianalis Tomoyasu Sato, M. F. Gomon & Nakabo, 2010 (longfin cucumberfish)
 Paraulopus maculatus (Kotthaus, 1967)
 Paraulopus melanogrammus M. F. Gomon & Tomoyasu Sato, 2004 (blackline cucumberfish)
 Paraulopus melanostomus Tomoyasu Sato, M. F. Gomon & Nakabo, 2010 (licoricemouth cucumberfish)
 Paraulopus nigripinnis (Günther, 1878) (cucumber fish)
 Paraulopus novaeseelandiae Tomoyasu Sato & Nakabo, 2002
 Paraulopus oblongus (Kamohara, 1953)
 Paraulopus okamurai Tomoyasu Sato & Nakabo, 2002 (piedtip cucumberfish)

References
 

Paraulopidae